Shirley Jackson Case (1872–1947) was an historian of early Christianity, and a liberal theologian. He served as dean of the Divinity School at the University of Chicago.

Biography

Case was born on September 28, 1872, in Hatfield Point, New Brunswick. He received a BA (1893) and MA (1896) in mathematics from Acadia University. He taught mathematics at the New Hampton Library Institute. In 1904, he obtained a Bachelor of Divinity degree from Yale Divinity School and a Doctor of Philosophy degree in 1908. He was professor of New Testament literature and interpretation at University of Chicago Divinity School until 1925. In 1924, he served as president of the American Society of Church History and, in 1926, served as president of the Society of Biblical Literature and Exegesis. 

Case is known for his research into the person of Jesus, who he argued was a historical person.

He edited The American Journal of Theology and its successor The Journal of Religion. Case considered himself a historian of Christianity. He was drawn to liberal theology. He was convinced that Jesus was an historical person and criticized the arguments of Christ myth theory proponents.

He died on December 5, 1947, in Lakeland, Florida.

Selected publications
Books

The Historicity of Jesus: A Criticism of the Contention that Jesus Never Lived, a Statement of the Evidence for His Existence, an Estimate of His Relation to Christianity (1912)
The Evolution of Early Christianity: A Genetic Study of First-Century Christianity in Relation to Its Religious Environment (1914)
The Revelation of John: A Historical Interpretation (1919)
The Social Origins of Christianity (1923)
Jesus: A New Biography (1927)
Experience With the Supernatural in Early Christian Times (1929)
The Social Triumph of the Ancient Church (1933)
Makers of Christianity: From Jesus to Charlemagne (1934)
Christianity in a Changing World (1941)
The Christian Philosophy of History (1943)
The Origins of Christian Supernaturalism (1946)

Papers

Case, Shirley Jackson. (1910). Is Jesus a Historical Character? Evidence for an Affirmative Opinion. The American Journal of Theology 15 (2): 205–227.
Case, Shirley Jackson. (1910). The Missionary Idea in Early Christianity. The Biblical World 36 (2): 113–125.
Case, Shirley Jackson. (1911). Jesus' Historicity: A Statement of the Problem. The American Journal of Theology 15 (2): 265–268.
Case, Shirley Jackson. (1911). Recent Books on the Question of Jesus' Existence. The American Journal of Theology 15 (4): 626–628. 
Case, Shirley Jackson. (1911). The Historicity of Jesus an Estimate of the Negative Argument. The American Journal of Theology 15 (1): 20–42.
Case, Shirley Jackson. (1913). The Problem of Christianity's Essence. The American Journal of Theology 17 (4): 541–562.
Case, Shirley Jackson. (1920). Reviewed Work: The Jesus Problem. A Restatement of the Myth Theory by J. M. Robertson. The Harvard Theological Review 13 (3): 295–296.
Case, Shirley Jackson. (1921). The Historical Study of Religion. The Journal of Religion 1 (1): 1–17.

See also
 Free Will Baptist

References

Footnotes

Bibliography

Further reading

External links
The Historicity of Jesus

1872 births
1947 deaths
20th-century Canadian Baptist ministers
20th-century Canadian historians
20th-century Canadian mathematicians
20th-century Protestant theologians
Acadia University alumni
Canadian Baptist theologians
Canadian historians of religion
Critics of the Christ myth theory
Florida Southern College faculty
University of Chicago Divinity School faculty
Writers from New Brunswick
Yale Divinity School alumni